James or Jim McNulty may refer to:

 James McNulty (Canadian politician) (1918–2011), Canadian politician
 James McNulty (Irish activist) (1890–1977), member Clan na Gael, commanded Doe Battalion of Irish Volunteers during Easter Rising
 James McNulty (physician) (1926–2017), Western Australia Commissioner for Health
 James A. McNulty (1900–1972), American Roman Catholic bishop
 James Barrett McNulty (1945–2016), former mayor of Scranton
 James F. McNulty Jr. (1925–2009), United States Representative from Arizona
 James F. McNulty (chief executive), executive for Parsons Corporation
 James F. McNulty (U.S. radio engineer) (1929–2014), the co-inventor with Frederick G. Weighart of digital radiography
 James F. McNulty (rear admiral) (1929–2006), naval warfare and nautical educator
 James J. McNulty, former C.E.O. of the Chicago Mercantile Exchange
 James Madison McNulty, Union Army Medical Director and alumnus of Geneva Medical College 
 James T. Nulty (1857–1935), U.S. inventor and legislator
 Jim McNulty (ice hockey), AHL hockey player
 Jimmy McNulty, fictional character on the American television series The Wire
 Jimmy McNulty (footballer) (born 1985), British footballer